Mendozahippus is an extinct genus of notohippid notoungulate which existed in Mendoza, Argentina, during the late Oligocene. Fossils are known from the site of Quebrada Fiera of the Agua de la Piedra Formation and includes a complete skull and two associated metatarsals, two maxillary fragments and five isolated upper teeth. It was first named by Esperanza Cerdeño and Bárbara Vera in 2010 and the type species is Mendozahippus fierensis.

References

Toxodonts
Oligocene mammals of South America
Deseadan
Paleogene Argentina
Fossils of Argentina
Fossil taxa described in 2010
Prehistoric placental genera